Liogluta is a genus of beetles belonging to the family Staphylinidae.

The species of this genus are found in Europe, Japan and Northern America.

Species:
 Liogluta abdominalis (Bernhauer, 1907) 
 Liogluta akiana Assing, 2004 
 Liogluta falcata Assing, 2010

References

Staphylinidae
Staphylinidae genera